Europa is an extended play (EP) by American DJ and record producer Diplo, released in February 2019. The EP highlights European artists. The first single, "Boom Bye Bye", features Niska.

Reception
Pitchfork rated the EP 4.2 out of 10.

Track listing
 "New Shapes" (feat. Octavian) - 2:45
 "Boom Bye Bye" (feat. Niska) - 3:46
 "Dip Raar" (feat. Bizzey & Ramiks) - 2:09
 "Baui Coupé" (feat. Bausa) - 2:42
 "Oh Maria" (feat. Soolking) - 2:48
 "Mira Mira" (feat. IAMDDB) - 2:28

Track listing adapted from the iTunes Store

References

2019 EPs
Diplo albums
Mad Decent albums